Milesia balteata is a species of hoverfly in the family Syrphidae.

Distribution
India, Laos, Malaysia, Thailand.

References

Insects described in 1901
Eristalinae
Diptera of Asia
Taxa named by Kálmán Kertész